Aleksey Mishin (Russian name: Алексей Мишин; born 17 April 1941) is a Soviet rower from Russia. He competed at the 1968 Summer Olympics in Mexico City with the men's coxed four where they came sixth.

References

1941 births
Living people
Soviet male rowers
Olympic rowers of the Soviet Union
Rowers at the 1968 Summer Olympics
Sportspeople from Krasnodar